The Ukrainian city of Zaporizhzhia has repeatedly been subject to airstrikes by Russian forces since February 2022 as part of the Russian invasion of Ukraine. Russian attacks on residential buildings have resulted in particularly high death tolls.

Background 
During the 2022 Russian invasion of Ukraine, Russian authorities and the Russian Armed Forces have repeatedly attacked civilians. In the Zaporizhzhia Oblast, an attack on a civilian convoy on 30 September killed 32 people and injured nearly 90 others. The attack preceded the annexation of the region.

On 8 October, an explosion caused major damage to the Crimean Bridge, a key supply route for the Russian Armed Forces to enter occupied Crimea.

2022

6 October 2022 
On 6 October 2022, at least 17 people including a child were killed when seven Russian missiles struck Zaporizhzhia, three of them reaching the residential center of the town.

9 October 2022 
In the early morning of 9 October 2022, six Russian missiles struck a residential area in Zaporizhzhia, destroying an apartment building and damaging 70 other buildings. The attack resulted in the deaths of 13 people, including a child. Another 89 were injured, 11 of whom are children. The missiles reportedly originated from Russian-controlled locations in Zaporizhzhia.

2023

2 March 2023 
On 2 March 2023, a Russian S-300 missile struck a five-story apartment building, killing 13 people, including a child.

See also 
 10 October 2022 missile strikes on Ukraine, another retaliatory attack for the Crimea Bridge explosion
 Attacks on civilians in the 2022 Russian invasion of Ukraine
 War crimes in the 2022 Russian invasion of Ukraine
 Zaporizhzhia civilian convoy attack
 2023 Dnipro residential building airstrike

References 

Airstrikes conducted by Russia
Airstrikes during the 2022 Russian invasion of Ukraine
Attacks on buildings and structures in 2022
Attacks on buildings and structures in Ukraine
October 2022 events in Ukraine
War crimes during the 2022 Russian invasion of Ukraine
Mass murder in 2022
21st-century mass murder in Ukraine
History of Zaporizhzhia
Child murder during the 2022 Russian invasion of Ukraine